Kiladangan GAA is a Tipperary GAA club which is located in County Tipperary, Ireland. Hurling is the main sport which is played in the "North Tipperary" divisional competitions. The club is centred on the village of Puckane but includes the areas of Ballycommon, Monsea and Dromineer near Nenagh.

Kiladangan was formerly known as Kildangan GAA, however in January 2016 the club reverted to its former name of Kiladangan GAA. At the present time both club names are used interchangeably.

Hurling club history
From the foundation of the club in 1915, teams competed in the various championships in County Tipperary – Senior, Intermediate and Junior under various guises, namely Kiladangan, Kildangan, Ballycommon, Carney, Knigh and Lahorna.

In 1930, Kiladangan and Kilbarron combined to win the intermediate championship, the amalgamation competed at senior level then until they won the senior championship in 1934. From then Kiladangan went on their own competing at senior level from 1935 to 1965 inclusive.

In 1966, Kiladangan went down to intermediate again before swiftly returning to the senior ranks in 1967. However, a return to intermediate ranks in 1968 before amalgamating with Burgess to form Na Piarsaigh and compete in the senior ranks in 1970.

Kiladangan competed on their own in the senior ranks once again in 1972 before returning to the intermediate ranks again in 1976 where they remained, except for 1996 when they competed in the junior championship, until 2005.

The return to the senior ranks in 2005 was preceded by capturing the county intermediate title, Munster intermediate cup and the all-Ireland intermediate cup beating Carrickshock of Kilkenny in a dramatic final in Thurles.
The club confirmed the return to top tier by capturing the clubs first North Senior title in 65 years in 2008.

Kildangan reached the final of the 2016 Tipperary Senior Hurling Championship where they lost to Thurles Sarsfields by 1–15 to 0–27. It was their first final since 1938. They were back in the final again in 2019 but again lost out to Borris-Ileigh 1-15 to 1-12.

On 20 September 2020, Kiladangan won the 2020 Tipperary Senior Hurling Championship after a 1-28 to 3-20 extra-time defeat of Loughmore-Castleiney in the final at Semple Stadium.  A late goal by Bryan McLoughney in extra-time won he game with Kiladangan one point behind at that stage. This was their first ever championship title.	

Over the years, many players from the club have represented Tipperary at various grades and the following is a list of players that have won All- Ireland medals in the blue and gold:

Senior Hurling:
 Marin Kennedy 1925, 1930 *
 Jimmy Kennedy 1949, 1950, 1951**
 Billy McLoughney 1961
 Seamus Hogan 1971
 Darragh Egan 2010           
Martin also collected 6 railway cup medals in 1928, 1929, 1930, 1931, 1934 and 1935 and was selected at full forward on the Tipperary team of the millennium.
Jimmy also won a Railway Cup medal in 1950

 
Intermediate Hurling:
 Jim Egan                             1972
 John D’Arcy                        1972
 Nicky Flannery                   1972
 Paddy Kelly                         1972
 Ollie Killeen                        1972
 Terry Moloney                   1972
 William Moloney               1972
 Noel Seymour                    1972
 Dan Hackett                       2000

Junior Hurling:
 Éamonn Kelly 1989, 1991
 Donal Flannery 1989
 Colm Egan 1989

 
Under 21 Hurling:
 Seamus Hogan                  1967
 Colm Egan                     1989
 Éamonn Kelly 1989
 Brian Flannery 1995
 Joe Gallagher 2010

 
Minor Hurling:
 Neddy McLoughney          1952
 Joe Gallagher                     2007

Notable Footballers
 Willie Connors

Achievements
 Tipperary Senior Hurling Championship Winners: 2020,  Runners-up 2016, 2019
 All-Ireland Intermediate Club Hurling Championship Winners 2005
 Munster Intermediate Club Hurling Championship Winners 2004
 Munster Junior Club Football Championship Runners-Up 2011
 North Tipperary Senior Hurling Championship Winner 1934 (with Kilbarron), 1938, 1943, 2008, 2013, 2015, 2016, 2019,2021
 Tipperary Intermediate Hurling Championship Winner 2004
 North Tipperary Intermediate Hurling Championship Winners 1930 (as Kilbarron-Kildangan), 1966, 1971, 1977, 1980, 2001, 2002, 2004
 North Tipperary Intermediate Football Championship Winners 1999, 2000, 2003, 2007, 2008
 Tipperary Junior A Hurling Championship: Winners 1971
 North Tipperary Junior A Hurling Championship: (1) 1944
 Tipperary Junior B Hurling Championship: (1) 2006
 North Tipperary Junior B Hurling Championship: (3) 2001, 2006,2021
 North Tipperary Junior C Hurling Championship : (1) 2021
 Tipperary Junior A Football Championship: (2) 1990, 2011
 North Tipperary Junior A Football Championship (4) 1990, 1998, 2011, 2022
 Tipperary Junior B Football Championship (1) 1997
 North Tipperary Junior B Football Championship (1) 1997
 North Tipperary Under-21 A Football Championship (3) 1999, 2000, 2011
 North Tipperary Under-21 B Football Championship (3) 1987, 1988, 1996
 Tipperary Under-21 A Hurling Championship (2) 1970, (with Burgess as Naomh Padraig), 1971 (with Burgess as Naomh Padraig)
 North Tipperary Under-21 A Hurling Championship (4) 1959, 1970 (with Burgess as Naomh Padraig), 1971 (with Burgess as Naomh Padraig), 2014
 Tipperary Under-21 B Hurling Championship (2) 2004, 2010
 North Tipperary Under-21 B Hurling Championship (5) 1999, 2004, 2008, 2010, 2012
 North Tipperary Minor A Football Championship (2) 1996, 2008
 North Tipperary Minor B Football Championship (4) 1987, 1992, 2011, 2013
 North Tipperary Minor A Hurling Championship (1) 2015
 Tipperary Minor B Hurling Championship (2) 1998, 2014
 North Tipperary Minor B Hurling Championship (4) 1982, 1998, 2003, 2014

Camogie History
The re-established Kildangan Camogie Club first fielded an U/12 team in the championship in 2002. An U/14 team found their feet that year playing challenge games for experience. From 2003 the club affiliated teams in the U/12 and U/14 league and championship. In 2006 we affiliated 5 teams at u/10s, u/12s, u/14s, and Junior B level.
Currently the team compete at Junior A level

ACHIEVEMENTS
Tipperary Junior B Hurling Championship: (1) 2009
Tipperary Junior A Hurling League: (1) 2022

References

External links
Tipperary GAA site
Official Kiladangan GAA Club website

Gaelic games clubs in County Tipperary
Hurling clubs in County Tipperary